Woodsia is a genus of ferns in the order Polypodiales. In the Pteridophyte Phylogeny Group classification of 2016 (PPG I), it is the only genus in the family Woodsiaceae, placed in the suborder Aspleniineae. The family can also be treated as the subfamily Woodsioideae  of a very broadly defined family Aspleniaceae sensu lato. Species of Woodsia are commonly known as cliff ferns.

Taxonomy
Woodsiaceae formerly included the members of the families Athyriaceae and Diplaziopsidaceae, but analysis has consistently shown that they should be treated as separate families. The following cladogram for the suborder Aspleniineae (as eupolypods II), based on Lehtonen (2011), and Rothfels & al. (2012), shows a likely phylogenetic relationship between the Woodsiaceae and the other families of the Aspleniineae.

Species
There are about 40–50 species of the genus Woodsia. , Plants of the World Online accepted the following species:

Woodsia alpina (Bolton) Gray – alpine woodsia
Woodsia andersonii (Bedd.) Christ
Woodsia angolensis Schelpe
Woodsia appalachiana T.M.C.Taylor
Woodsia asiatica Kiselev & Shmakov
Woodsia burgessiana Gerrard ex Hook. & Baker
Woodsia calcarea (Fomin) Shmakov
Woodsia canescens (Kunze) Mett.
Woodsia cinnamomea Christ
Woodsia cochisensis Windham
Woodsia cycloloba Hand.-Mazz.
Woodsia cystopteroides Windham & Mickel
Woodsia elongata Hook.
Woodsia fragilis (Trevis.) T.Moore
Woodsia glabella R.Br. – smooth cliff fern
Woodsia gorovoii Krestsch. & Shmakov
Woodsia guizhouensis P.S.Wang, Q.Luo & Li Bing Zhang
Woodsia hancockii Baker
Woodsia heterophylla (Turcz. ex Fomin) Shmakov
Woodsia ilvensis (L.) R.Br. – oblong woodsia, rusty cliff fern
Woodsia indusiosa Christ
Woodsia kangdingensis H.S.Kung, Li Bing Zhang & X.S.Guo
Woodsia lanosa Hook.
Woodsia macrochlaena Mett. ex Kuhn
Woodsia macrospora C.Chr. & Maxon
Woodsia manchuriensis Hook.
Woodsia mexicana Fée
Woodsia microsora Kodama
Woodsia mollis (Kaulf.) J.Sm.
Woodsia montevidensis Hieron.
Woodsia neomexicana Windham – New Mexican cliff fern
Woodsia nikkoensis H.Ogura & Nakaike
Woodsia oblonga Ching & S.H.Wu
Woodsia obtusa (Spreng.) Torr. – blunt-lobed woodsia, bluntlobe cliff fern
Woodsia okamotoi Tagawa
Woodsia oregana D.C.Eaton – Oregon cliff fern
Woodsia phillipsii Windham
Woodsia pilosa Ching
Woodsia pinnatifida (Fomin) Shmakov
Woodsia plummerae Lemmon – Plummer's cliff fern
Woodsia polystichoides D.C.Eaton
Woodsia pseudoilvensis Tagawa
Woodsia pseudopolystichoides (Fomin) Kiselev & Shmakov
Woodsia pubescens Spreng.
Woodsia pulchella Bertol.
Woodsia rosthorniana Diels
Woodsia saitoana Tagawa
Woodsia scopulina D.C.Eaton – Rocky Mountain woodsia
Woodsia shensiensis Ching
Woodsia sinica Ching
Woodsia subcordata Turcz.
Woodsia subintermedia Tzvelev
Woodsia taigischensis (Stepanov) Kuznetsov

Some hybrids are also known:
Woodsia × abbeae Butters
Woodsia × gracilis (G.Lawson) Butters
Woodsia × kansana R.E.Brooks
Woodsia × maxonii R.M.Tryon
Woodsia × tryonis B.Boivin

References

 
Fern genera
Taxonomy articles created by Polbot